Scarville is a city in Winnebago County, Iowa, United States. The population was 74 at the time of the 2020 census.

History
Scarville was platted in 1899, and incorporated as a city in 1904. The city was named for Ole Scar, a local landowner.

In 1973, investigators from the United States Atomic Energy Commission investigated a possible criticality accident on a railcar at the local grain elevator, but nothing conclusive was found.

Geography
Scarville's longitude and latitude coordinates in decimal form are 43.470519, -93.616480.

Demographics

2010 census
As of the census of 2010, there were 72 people, 36 households, and 18 families living in the city. The racial makeup of the city was 97.2% White, 1.4% Native American, and 1.4% Asian.

There were 36 households, of which 30.6% had children under the age of 18 living with them, 38.9% were married couples living together, 5.6% had a female householder with no husband present, 5.6% had a male householder with no wife present, and 50.0% were non-families. 47.2% of all households were made up of individuals, and 25% had someone living alone who was 65 years of age or older. The average household size was 2.00 and the average family size was 2.94.

The median age in the city was 41 years. 23.6% of residents were under the age of 18; 5.6% were between the ages of 18 and 24; 25% were from 25 to 44; 25.1% were from 45 to 64; and 20.8% were 65 years of age or older. The gender makeup of the city was 41.7% male and 58.3% female.

2000 census
At the 2000 census, there were 97 people, 41 households and 25 families living in the city. The racial makeup of the city was 95.88% White and 4.12% Native American.

There were 41 households, of which 34.1% had children under the age of 18 living with them, 48.8% were married couples living together, 7.3% had a female householder with no husband present, and 36.6% were non-families. 34.1% of all households were made up of individuals, and 9.8% had someone living alone who was 65 years of age or older. The average household size was 2.37 and the average family size was 2.92.

32.0% of the population were under the age of 18, 4.1% from 18 to 24, 24.7% from 25 to 44, 23.7% from 45 to 64, and 15.5% who were 65 years of age or older. The median age was 36 years. For every 100 females, there were 90.2 males. For every 100 females age 18 and over, there were 100.0 males.

The median household income was $40,139 and the median family income was $38,750. Males had a median income of $30,000 versus $21,500 for females. The per capita income for the city was $18,949. There were 6.3% of families and 6.9% of the population living below the poverty line, including 6.7% of under eighteens and none of those over 64.

Education
The Lake Mills Community School District operates local public schools.

Scarville Lutheran School is a Christian elementary school of the Evangelical Lutheran Synod in Scarville.

References

Cities in Winnebago County, Iowa
Cities in Iowa
1899 establishments in Iowa